Screenplay is an international film festival held annually in Shetland, Scotland. The festival is curated by the film critic Mark Kermode and the film historian Linda Ruth Williams in partnership with Shetland Arts. Since 2012 the festival has been hosted by Mareel arts venue in Lerwick.

History 
The festival was founded in 2006 after Kermode was asked to help start a festival when appearing at Shetland's Wordplay book festival. When the festival was founded there were no cinemas in Shetland, so screenings were held in a variety of venues across the islands including the Lerwick livestock market, a bus shelter in Unst, village halls and the Garrison Theatre. Since 2012 the festival has been hosted by the purpose built cinema and arts venue Mareel.

References 

Film festivals in Scotland
Mass media in Shetland